N-terminal EF-hand calcium-binding protein 3 is a protein that in humans is encoded by the NECAB3 gene.

The protein encoded by this gene interacts with the amino-terminal domain of the amyloid beta A4 precursor protein-binding family A member 2 (APBA2), inhibits the association of APBA2 with amyloid precursor protein through a non-competitive mechanism, and abolishes the suppression of beta-amyloid production by APBA2. This protein, together with APBA2, may play an important role in the regulatory system of amyloid precursor protein metabolism and beta-amyloid generation. This gene consists of at least 13 exons and its alternative splicing generates at least 2 transcript variants.

See also
 N-terminal
 EF-hand

References

External links

Further reading